Kangra-Gaggal Airport , officially known as Kangra Airport, is a regional airport serving areas of Kangra including Dharamshala, the winter capital of Himachal Pradesh, India. Kangra Airport is located on National Highway 154, that runs between Pathankot and Mandi, and is the largest airport in Himachal Pradesh in terms of Passengers and Aircraft movement.

History
The foundation of Kangra  airport was laid down by Virbhadra Singh, the then Chief Minister of Himachal Pradesh, on 15 October, 1986. The first scheduled operation at this airport was by Vayudoot with a Dornier 228 in the 1990. Subsequently other airlines like Jagson, Air Deccan and Kingfisher also operated from this Airport. In 2001, the airport was renamed as Kangra airport. As a result, for the first time an ATR-42 aircraft of Air Deccan landed at Kangra Airport on 28 March 2007. Subsequently, other airlines also started operating on this route, with SpiceJet and Alliance Air starting from 2013.

Structure
Its  apron provides parking space for two turboprop aircraft, like the ATR 72, and Dash 8 Series 400, while its terminal building can handle 100 passengers, 50 in the arrival area and 50 in the departure area. Due to its shorter runway as well as high altitude, the airport has a load penalty and aircraft at this airport are not allowed to take-off with full capacity, leading to under-utilization and higher airfares on this route.

Navigational aids include precision approach path indicator (PAPI) lights and VHF omnidirectional range (DVOR). The airport falls in Category II(c) of International Civil Aviation Organization (ICAO) standards  due to limited instrument landing system (ILS) capabilities.

Expansion plans and delays
In October 2013, for first time, the issue of expansion of Kangra Airport came up officially, when Ministry of Civil Aviation hinted at expanding Gaggal Airport and  conducting a fresh survey for expansion of the airport. In August 2014, the District Administration was ordered to carry out the expansion survey and wrote to the Airports Authority of India (AAI) in this regard. Following this, a team of AAI Officials visited the airport in May 2015 for feasibility study and identification of land required.

As a result, in January and February 2020, there were demonstrations by the locals against the government.

In March 2021, Obstruction Level Survey (OLS) for proposed expansion was carried out by AAI.
A total of Rs 400 Crores were recommended by the Fifteenth Finance Commission for the expansion of Kangra Airport, which have been granted by the Central Government.
In March 2022, AAI came up with a two phase expansion plan for Kangra Airport.

If first phase is completed, it will help turboprop airplanes in taking off and landing at the Gaggal airport with full capacity without load penalty.
  
This expansion will enable narrow bodied turbofan aircraft like Airbus-320/330 and Boeing 737 to easily operate from this airport. This would not only providea  major boost to the tourism sector for Kangra district, but would also serve Chamba, Hamirpur and Una districts.

In November 2022, CWPRS, Pune was consulted to study the feasibility of constructing runway bridge over Manjhi River, which gave its nod in this regard in a report submitted to state Government  in February, 2023. Meanwhile, after State Assembly elections and formation of new Government in December 2022, Kangra District was identified to be developed as Tourism Capital of the state. Consequently, the expansion of Kangra Airport got a new impetus. Further, it was also decided to complete the land acquisition process for both phases simultaneously.  In this regard, in March 2023, the Social Impact Assessment of the expansion project was ordered by the Government to be carried by Himachal Pradesh Institute of Public Administration(HIPA). In order to complete the land acquisition proceedings and start the expansion work as soon as possible, the State Government in Budget 2023-24 allocated Rs 2000 Crore for this purpose.

Proposed expansion plans

Last year, the expansion plans were released to general public so that they can plan accordingly to rehabilitate  or relocate to newer places.

Airlines and destinations

Statistics

References

External links
 
 Kangra (Gaggal) Airport at Airports Authority of India web site

Airports in Himachal Pradesh
Transport in Dharamshala
Transport in Kangra, Himachal Pradesh
Airports with year of establishment missing